Tifton 85 is a hybrid  strain of Bermudagrass Cynodon dactylon, a forage perennial grass that originated in Africa and was brought to the United States as a pasture and hay crop for the humid Southern states. This variety was incorrectly reported by CBS News to be a genetically modified organism (GMO).

History 
In the 1950s, several superior hybrid varieties were developed via cross-breeding. Tifton 85 is a conventionally bred hybrid essentially created by conventional cross pollination methods.  

Tifton 85 was developed at the USDA Agricultural Research Station at Tifton, Georgia, in 1992 by Dr. Glenn Burton. He developed Coastal Bermudagrass in 1943.

Poisoned cattle 
Tifton 85, like some other grasses (e.g. sorghum), produces cyanide under certain conditions and has been implicated in livestock deaths due to a condition commonly known as 'bloat', or Prussic Acid Poisoning.

In June 2012 15 head of cattle in Bastrop County, Texas (near Austin) died of Prussic acid poisoning related to the consumption of Tifton 85. Before this event the cattle had been fed this grass for 15 years with no toxicity issues.

References

Minimizing the Prussic Acid Poisoning Hazard in Forages AY-196 C. L. Rhykerd and K. D. Johnson Agronomy Department, Purdue University Purdue University http://www.agry.purdue.edu/ext/forages/publications/ay196.htm
The Merck Veterinary Manual. 2006; Merck & Co., Inc. Whitehouse Station NJ, USA. Available on-line at https://web.archive.org/web/20020720150545/http://www.merckvetmanual.com/mvm/index.jsp
Nitrate and Prussic Acid Toxicity in Forage. MF 1018. Cooperative Extension Service, Kansas State University, Manhattan. Available on-line at http://www.oznet.ksu.edu/library/crpsl2/MF1018.PDF
Precautions When Utilizing Sorghum / Sudan Crops as Cattle Feed. 2006. University of Missouri Extension. Available on-line at http://agebb.missouri.edu/drought/sudan.htm

Lawn grasses